The Handball Association of Hong Kong, China (HAHKC) is the administrative and controlling body for handball and beach handball in Hong Kong, China. HAHKC is a member of the Asian Handball Federation (AHF) and member of the International Handball Federation (IHF) since 1974.

National teams
 Hong Kong men's national handball team
 Hong Kong men's national junior handball team
 Hong Kong women's national handball team
 Hong Kong national beach handball team
 Hong Kong women's national beach handball team

Competitions hosted
 2017 Asian Women's Junior Handball Championship
 2013 Asian Beach Handball Championship

References

External links
 Official website  
 Hong Kong, China at the IHF website.
 Hong Kong, China at the AHF website.

Sports organizations established in 1970
1970 establishments in Hong Kong
Handball governing bodies
Handball in Hong Kong
Sports governing bodies in Hong Kong
Asian Handball Federation
National members of the International Handball Federation